The Iranian Volleyball Super League 2020–21 was the 34th season of the Iranian Volleyball Super League, the highest professional volleyball league in Iran. The season started on 9 September 2020 and ended on 16 March 2021. IRIVF announced on 2 September 2020 that Shahrdari Qazvin were excluded from the league due to non-fulfillment of their obligations. Shahrvand Arak replaced them. But, Shahrdari Qazvin took the necessary measures for its financial obligations after being eliminated from the league and re-applied to participate in the league. On 6 September 2020, since all participating teams agreed, it was announced that Shahrdari Qazvin would participate in the league. Due to COVID-19 pandemic in Iran, the season was suspended on 10 October 2020 and resumed on 8 November 2020. Since the season resumed, the regular season matches were held at the neutral venues in Tehran (Azadi Volleyball Hall and Tehran House of Volleyball).

Regular season

Standings

Shahrvand Arak were excluded from the league during the regular season due to non-fulfillment of their obligations. All results were declared null and void.

Results

Playoffs
Venue: Azadi Volleyball Hall, Tehran
All times are Iran Standard Time (UTC+03:30).
All series were the best-of-three format.

Quarterfinals
Foolad Sepahan vs. Shahrdari Varamin

Foolad Sirjan vs. Saipa Tehran

Shahrdari Urmia vs. Shahrdari Gonbad

Shahdab Yazd vs. Labanyat Haraz Amol

Semifinals
Foolad Sepahan vs. Foolad Sirjan

Shahrdari Urmia vs. Labanyat Haraz Amol

3rd place
Foolad Sepahan vs. Labanyat Haraz Amol

The 3rd place playoffs between Foolad Sepahan and Labanyat Haraz Amol were canceled for various reasons. The two teams shared the 3rd place.

Final
Foolad Sirjan vs. Shahrdari Urmia

Final standings

References

External links
Iran Volleyball Federation

League 2020-21
Iran Super League, 2020-21
Iran Super League, 2020-21
Volleyball League, 2020-21
Volleyball League, 2020-21